The Shooting Star State Trail is a multi-use recreational trail in southeastern Minnesota, USA. It runs  between the towns of LeRoy and Austin, where it intersects with an expanded Blazing Star State Trail to Lyle.

The route largely follows a leg of Minnesota State Highway 56, which was designated the Shooting Star Wildflower and Historic Route Scenic Byway.  Both trail and byway are named for the shooting star, a wildflower. The trail was built on the roadbed of the former Milwaukee Road.

References

External links
 Shooting Star State Trail

Minnesota state trails
Protected areas of Mower County, Minnesota